Тhe 2018 Liga 3 was the second season under its current name and 31st third-tier season after the creation of independent football league system in Georgia. As a single two-round competition, it began on 5 March and ended on 6 December.

Team changes
The following teams have changed division since the 2017 season:

From Liga 3

Promoted to Liga 2

Shevardeni-1906 Tbilisi ● Merani Tbilisi ● Telavi

Relegated to Regionuli Liga

Odishi 1919 Zugdidi ● Chkherimela Kharagauli ● Liakhvi Tskhinvali ● Sapovnela Terjola ● Skuri Tsalenjikha  ● Margveti Zestafoni

To Liga 3

Relegated from Liga 2

Zugdidi ● Meshakhte Tkibuli  ● Guria Lanchkhuti

Promoted from Regionuli Liga

Varketili Tbilisi ● Saburtalo-2 Tbilisi ● Matchakhela Khelvachauri ● Bakhmaro Chokhatauri ● Aragvi Dusheti ● Samgurali-2 Tskaltubo

Teams and stadiums

League table

In their first season in the third tier, Zugdidi won the league through automatic promotion after a tight contest concluded in the last matchday of the season. Both teams representing the region of Guria qualified for play-offs, although only one of them succeeded in them. 

According to the Federation's decision, a drastic reduction of the league teams involved ten clubs, who were supposed to be relegated to Liga 4 and Regionuli Liga next year.

Promotion play-offs 

2–2 on aggregate, Guria Lanchkhuti won on away goals.

Bakhmaro lost 4–1 on aggregate.

Relegation play-offs

Imereti won 2–0 on aggregate and earned a slot in Liga 4

Gareji won 7–1 on aggregate and advanced to Liga 4 from Regionuli Liga

References

External links
Georgian Football Federation

Liga 3 (Georgia) seasons
3
Georgia
Georgia